WZNS (branded as Z-96) is a radio station serving the Fort Walton Beach, Florida area with a contemporary hit radio format. This station broadcasts on FM frequency 96.5 MHz and is under ownership of Cumulus Media.

External links
Z-96 - Official Site

ZNS
Contemporary hit radio stations in the United States
Cumulus Media radio stations
1997 establishments in Florida
Radio stations established in 1997